Ndidi Onukwulu is a Canadian singer-songwriter born in British Columbia. Although her style is often classified as jazz and blues, Onukwulu combines several musical genres in her songs including surf music, electric blues, gospel, and country. She has frequently toured across Canada and Europe in support of her records.

Life 
Although Onukwulu never had any interest in music at an early age and she did not consider a career as a singer until her friends heard her sing in her early adult years. She moved to New York City, where she sang on the open-mic circuit. During her time in New York, she met several hip-hop and blues musicians who influenced her atypical style. Next Onukwulu moved to Toronto where she first became a member of a rock band. Later, she joined the electronica group Stop Die Resuscitate.
Eventually, Onukwulu moved back to a more definitively blues style and began performing at prominent venues including Massey Hall in Toronto. In January 2006 Onukwulu released her first album No, I Never. The album release was followed by a tour that garnered positive buzz in the Canadian blues community.
	
Following a bad break-up in December 2006, Onukwulu spent 2007 composing new music. In addition to drawing on the experiences of her relationship, she found inspiration by visiting cemeteries and imagining stories for the deceased people whose graves she visited. Onukwulu united the ideas of death and the end of relationships to create the eclectic music featured on her second album The Contradictor. This album introduced the more diverse styles for which she is now known. The album got its name from the contradiction between the upbeat music and its more serious themes, in addition to elements of the singer's own personality. The Contradictor, released on June 17, 2008, was produced by Steve Dawson under the Indie record label Jericho Beach Music.
She then went on to Europe, where she signed a deal with Universal Jazz and Classics France and went on to write and record two additional albums " The Escape"  2011 and "Dark Swing" 2014

Discography

See also 

 Madagascar Slim
 Vancouver Folk Music Festival

References

External links
 Official website
 
 

Canadian women jazz singers
Canadian blues singers
21st-century Black Canadian women singers
Musicians from British Columbia
Living people
Canadian people of Nigerian descent
Canadian film actresses
Black Canadian actresses
Year of birth missing (living people)